Another Morning may refer to:

 "Another Morning" (The Pillows song)
 "Another Morning" (The Moody Blues song), 1967